Jayesh Uday Bugad is an Indian Inline Speed skater, who represented India in Flanders Grand Prix 2014. He is from Ichalkaranji, Maharashtra, India.

He is an Indian skating champion and holds more than 3 World Records in skating.

Competitions

References 

2000 births
Living people
People from Ichalkaranji
Indian male speed skaters